Odyssey is the second full-length album by electroclash duo and performance troupe Fischerspooner, released on April 5, 2005, in the United States, and on April 11 around the world. Despite being recognized as one of the more successful acts from the electroclash scene, Fischerspooner changed their musical direction, and created Odyssey as more of a synthpop record. The album features several guest contributors such as David Byrne, Linda Perry, Hole's guitarist Eric Erlandson, Mirwais and Susan Sontag.  The songs "Natural Disaster," "Never Win," and "Happy" were featured in the 2006 film Grandma's Boy, and the last two songs were included on the soundtrack.

Critical reception

Odyssey received generally favorable reviews. The album holds a score of 70 out of 100 on the review aggregator website Metacritic.

Track listing

Charts

Album charts

Singles

References

2005 albums
Fischerspooner albums
Albums produced by Tony Hoffer
Albums produced by Victor Van Vugt